Protomyzon is a genus of gastromyzontid loaches endemic to Borneo.

Species
There are currently four recognized species in this genus:
 Protomyzon aphelocheilus Inger & P. K. Chin, 1962
 Protomyzon borneensis Hora & Jayaram, 1952
 Protomyzon griswoldi (Hora & Jayaram, 1952)
 Protomyzon whiteheadi (Vaillant, 1894)

See also
 Yaoshania pachychilus, the so-called panda loach, which was formerly included in Protomyzon.

References

Gastromyzontidae
Freshwater fish of Asia
Endemic fauna of Borneo